The 2022 FIBA AmeriCup qualification was a basketball competition that was played from June 2018 to February 2021, to determine the eleven FIBA Americas nations who would join the automatically qualified host Brazil at the 2022 FIBA AmeriCup.

Sub-zone pre-qualifiers

South American Pre-qualifiers
Three teams were eligible to participate in the South American pre-qualifiers. Following suspension of Peru, Bolivia and Ecuador played two-legged match with overall winner advanced to the pre-qualifiers.

Central American Pre-qualifiers
Six teams were eligible to participate in the Central American pre-qualifiers. They were drawn into two groups by three teams. Following withdrawals of Nicaragua, Guatemala and Honduras, only three teams were left to play the Central American pre-qualifiers. Instead, they played single round-robin tournament with winner qualified for the pre-qualifiers.

Caribbean Pre-qualifiers
Ten teams participated in the Caribbean pre-qualifiers to qualify for the pre-qualifiers.

Group A

Group B

Classification round

5–8th place semifinals

Ninth place game

Seventh place game

Fifth place game

Final round

Semifinals

Third place game

Final

Final standings

Pre-qualifiers
Eight teams participated in the Pan-American pre-qualifiers. They were drawn into two groups by four teams. Top two teams from each group advanced to the qualifiers.

All times are local.

Group A

Group B

Qualifiers

Draw
The draw was held on 23 July 2019.

Seeding
The seedings were announced on 19 July 2019.

Groups
All times are local.

Due to the COVID-19 pandemic, each group played the November 2020 window at a single venue. The same will be done for the February 2021 window.

Group A

Group B

Group C

Group D

Qualified teams

Notes

References

External links 
Qualifiers

FIBA AmeriCup qualification
qualification